The Wrong Man is a 1956 American docudrama film noir directed by Alfred Hitchcock and starring Henry Fonda and Vera Miles. The film was drawn from the true story of an innocent man charged with a crime, as described in the book The True Story of Christopher Emmanuel Balestrero by Maxwell Anderson and in the magazine article "A Case of Identity", which was published in Life magazine in June 1953 by Herbert Brean.

It is one of the few Hitchcock films based on a true story and whose plot closely follows the real-life events.

The Wrong Man had a notable effect on two significant directors: it prompted Jean-Luc Godard's longest piece of written criticism in his years as a critic, and it has been cited as an influence on Martin Scorsese's Taxi Driver.

Plot 
Alfred Hitchcock appears on screen to tell the audience that the film's "every word is true".

Christopher Emanuel "Manny" Balestrero (Henry Fonda), a down-on-his-luck musician at New York City's Stork Club, needs $300 for dental work for his wife Rose (Vera Miles). When he visits the office of a life insurance company to borrow money against Rose's policy, he is mistaken by the staff there for a man who had twice held them up.

He is questioned by the police, who call him "Chris" rather than Manny, and tell him that they are looking for a man who had robbed the insurance company and other businesses and that he might be their man. Manny is instructed to walk in and out of a liquor store and a delicatessen which had also been robbed by the same man. He is then asked to write the words from a stick-up note used by the robber in the insurance company robbery; he misspells the word "drawer" as "draw"the same mistake made in the robber's note. After being picked out of a police lineup by an employee of the insurance company who had witnessed the robberies he is arrested on charges of armed robbery.

Attorney Frank O'Connor (Anthony Quayle) sets out to prove that Manny cannot possibly be the right man: at the time of the first hold-up he was on vacation with his family, and at the time of the second his jaw was so swollen that witnesses would certainly have noticed. Of three people who saw the boy fall at the vacation hotel, two have died and the third cannot be found. All this devastates Rose, whose resulting depression forces her to be hospitalized.

During Manny's trial he prays the rosary after his mother urges him to pray for strength. A juror's remark forces a mistrial. While awaiting a second trial Manny is exonerated when the true robber is arrested holding up a grocery store. Manny visits Rose at the hospital to share the good news, but, as the film ends, she remains severely depressed; a textual epilogue explains that she recovered two years later.

Cast
 Henry Fonda as Christopher Emmanuel "Manny" Balestrero
 Vera Miles as Rose Balestrero
 Anthony Quayle as Frank O'Connor
 Harold J. Stone as Det. Lt. Bowers
 Charles Cooper as Det. Matthews
 John Hildebrand as Tomasini
 Esther Minciotti as Mama Balestrero
 Doreen Lang as Ann James
 Laurinda Barrett as Constance Willis
 Norma Connolly as Betty Todd
 Nehemiah Persoff as Gene Conforti
 Lola D'Annunzio as Olga Conforti
 Werner Klemperer as Dr. Bannay
 Kippy Campbell as Robert Balestrero
 Robert Essen as Gregory Balestrero
 Richard Robbins as Daniel, the guilty man

Cast notes
 Actors appearing in the film, but not listed in the credits, include Harry Dean Stanton, David Kelly, Tuesday Weld,  Patricia Morrow, Bonnie Franklin, and Barney Martin. Weld and Franklin made their film debuts as two adolescent giggly girls answering the door when the Balestreros are seeking witnesses to prove his innocence.

Historical notes
Balestrero's attorney, the real Frank O'Connor (1909–1992) was a former New York State Senator at the time of the trial, and later became the district attorney of Queens County (New York City, New York), the president of the New York City Council and an appellate-court judge.

Rose Balestrero (1910–1982) died in Florida at the age of 72. Despite the claim in the film's epilogue, Rose never fully recovered after her nervous breakdown. She blamed herself for her husband's arrest. Manny Balestrero (1909–1998) outlived his wife by sixteen years, dying in North Carolina aged 88.  He did love the Hitchcock film, based on his life.

Chris and Rose's son, Gregory, went on to earn a bachelor's degree in industrial engineering from the Georgia Institute of Technology and has become the CEO of the Project Management Institute.

Chris Balestrero sued the city for false arrest. Asking $500,000, he accepted a settlement of just $7,000. He earned $22,000 from the film, which went to repaying loans for Rose's care.

A street is named "Manny 'The Wrong Man' Balestrero Way" at 73rd Street and 41st Avenue in Jackson Heights, New York. The street is not far from the former real-life Balestrero home.

Production
A Hitchcock cameo is typical of most of his films. In The Wrong Man, he appears only in silhouette in a darkened studio, just before the credits at the beginning of the film, announcing that the story is true.
Originally, he intended to be seen as a customer walking into the Stork Club, but he edited himself out of the final print.

Many scenes were filmed in Jackson Heights, the neighborhood where Manny lived when he was accused. Most of the prison scenes were filmed among the convicts in a New York City prison in Queens. The courthouse was located at the corner of Catalpa Avenue and 64th Street in Ridgewood.

Bernard Herrmann composed the soundtrack, as he had for all of Hitchcock's films from The Trouble with Harry (1955) to Marnie (1964). It is one of the most subdued scores Herrmann ever wrote, and one of the few he composed with some jazz elements, here primarily to represent Fonda's appearance as a musician in the nightclub scenes.

This was Hitchcock's final film for Warner Bros. It completed a contract commitment that had begun with two films produced for Transatlantic Pictures and released by Warner Brothers: Rope (1948) and Under Capricorn (1949), his first two films in Technicolor. After The Wrong Man, Hitchcock returned to Paramount Pictures.

Reception
A. H. Weiler of The New York Times wrote that Hitchcock "has fashioned a somber case history that merely points a finger of accusation. His principals are sincere and they enact a series of events that actually are part of New York's annals of crime but they rarely stir the emotions or make a viewer's spine tingle. Frighteningly authentic, the story generates only a modicum of drama." Philip K. Scheuer of the Los Angeles Times agreed, writing that "As drama, unhappily, it proves again that life can be more interminable than fiction." Richard L. Coe of The Washington Post wrote, "Having succeeded often in making fiction seem like fact, Alfred Hitchcock in 'The Wrong Man' now manages to make fact seem like fiction. But it is not good nor interesting fiction." John McCarten of The New Yorker declared, "Mr. Hitchcock makes a good point about the obtuseness of a police group that holds firm to the belief that everyone is guilty until proved innocent, but his story of the badgered musician is never very gripping." The Monthly Film Bulletin wrote that the early police procedural scenes "make a powerful contribution to the effectiveness of the film's first part," but that Rose's hospitalization felt like a "dramatically gratuitous development, particularly as its demands are ill met by the actress concerned," and that the final act of the film suffered a "slow decline into a flatly factual ending."

Variety called the film "a gripping piece of realism" that builds to a "powerful climax, the events providing director a field day in his art of characterization and suspense." Harrison's Reports was also positive, calling it "Grim but absorbing melodramatic fare" with Henry Fonda and Vera Miles "highly effective" in their roles. Jean-Luc Godard, in his lengthy treatise on the film, wrote: "The only suspense in The Wrong Man is that of chance itself. The subject of this film lies less in the unexpectedness of events than in their probability. With each shot, each transition, each composition, Hitchcock does the only thing possible for the rather paradoxical but compelling reason that he could do anything he liked." The film ranked 4th on Cahiers du Cinéma's Top 10 Films of the Year List in 1956.

More recent assessments have been more uniformly positive. The film holds an approval rating of 92% on Rotten Tomatoes, based on reviews from 26 surveyed critics with an average rating of 8.1/10. Glenn Kenny, writing for RogerEbert.com in 2016, stated that the film may be the "least fun" of Hitchcock's Hollywood period, but that it "is as fluently styled a movie as Hitchcock ever made." Richard Brody of The New Yorker wrote that "few films play so tightly on the contrast between unimpeachably concrete details and the vertiginous pretenses of reality. Hitchcock’s ultimate point evokes cosmic terror: innocence is merely a trick of paperwork, whereas guilt is the human condition." In 1998, Jonathan Rosenbaum of the Chicago Reader included the film in his unranked list of the best American films not included on the AFI Top 100.

See also
 List of American films of 1956
 Trial film

References

External links

 
 
 
 
 
 The Wrong Man DVD review of the film at Vista Records
 The Wrong Man Slant magazine review of film

1956 films
1956 crime drama films
American crime drama films
American black-and-white films
American courtroom films
Drama films based on actual events
1950s English-language films
Film noir
Films scored by Bernard Herrmann
Films about miscarriage of justice
Films based on non-fiction books
Films directed by Alfred Hitchcock
Films produced by Alfred Hitchcock
Films set in 1953
Films set in New York City
Films shot in New York City
Crime films based on actual events
Warner Bros. films
1950s American films